Jones Crossroads is an unincorporated community in Harris and Troup counties, in the U.S. state of Georgia.

History
The community was named after Christopher Columbus Jones, the original owner of the town site. Previous variant names are "Palina", "Paulina" and "Union".

The R. M. Jones General Store, a historic country store listed on the National Register of Historic Places, stands at Jones Crossroads.

References

Unincorporated communities in Harris County, Georgia
Unincorporated communities in Troup County, Georgia